José Guillermo Tormos Vega (born 23 February 1925), known as Joselín, was a Puerto Rican politician and Mayor of Ponce, Puerto Rico from 2 January 1977 to 22 February 1984. Tormos Vega is credited with establishing, during his term as mayor, Centro Ceremonial Indígena de Tibes as a museum.

Elections
In the November 1976 elections, Tormos Vega defeated the incumbent mayor, Luis A. Morales, by more than 3,000 votes. He was re-elected in 1980.

Mayoral term
Among the public works projects that took place in the city during his tenure are the construction of the Cruceta El Vigía, the renovation of City Hall, and the Coto Laurel village square. He is also credited with establishing, during his term as mayor, Centro Ceremonial Indígena de Tibes as a museum.

In 1983, Tormos Vega honored long-time local legend Carlos Garay Villamil for his contributions to the traditions of the city of Ponce in his capacity as a horse-drawn carriage coachman. A plaque has since been added to the front facade of the Ponce City Hall to commemorate the event.

Charged with extortion
Tormos Vega quit his position in 1984 upon being charged with extortion. He was replaced by José Dapena Thompson who, two and a half years later and in the midst of a hotly debated electoral campaign was forced to resign allegedly to dodge potential criminal prosecution for corruption. Tormos Vega died in jail a few years later.

See also
 List of Puerto Ricans

References

Further reading
 Fay Fowlie de Flores. Ponce, Perla del Sur: Una Bibliografía Anotada. Segunda Edición. 1997. Ponce, Puerto Rico: Universidad de Puerto Rico en Ponce. p. 337. Item 1677. 
 Ponce. Manual sobre el gobierno municipal. Ponce, Puerto Rico: Imprenta Municipal. 1982. (Archivo Histórico Municipal de Ponce, AHMP; Colegio Universitario Tecnológico de Ponce)
 Fay Fowlie de Flores. Ponce, Perla del Sur: Una Bibliografía Anotada. Segunda Edición. 1997. Ponce, Puerto Rico: Universidad de Puerto Rico en Ponce. p. 337. Item 1679. 
 Ponce. Revision del Plan comprensivo del Municipio de Ponce. Hon. Jose G. Tormos Vega, Alcalde. M. Sosa y Asoc., consultores. Ponce, Puerto Rico. 1977. (Colegio Universitario Tecnológico de Ponce)

New Progressive Party (Puerto Rico) politicians
Mayors of Ponce, Puerto Rico
Politicians convicted of extortion under color of official right
1925 births
Year of death missing